Western Division of Camden was an electoral district for the Legislative Assembly in the Australian state of New South Wales from 1856 to 1857. Its name was changed to West Camden between 1858 and 1859, when it was replaced by the electoral district of Camden. It elected two members simultaneously, with voters casting two votes and the first two candidates being elected. The electorate was based on western Camden County, which adjoins the Cumberland County (Sydney Basin) to the south, including the Southern Highlands and, to the east, the Illawarra.

Candidates were elected in 1856, and 1858. There was also a by-election in 1856 as a result of James Macarthur resignation due to concerns about the constitutionality of the 1856 elections, in which he was re-elected unopposed.

Members for Western Division of Camden

Election results

References

Former electoral districts of New South Wales
1856 establishments in Australia
1859 disestablishments in Australia
Constituencies established in 1856
Constituencies disestablished in 1859